Mahapach ("revolution" or "upheaval") refers to the political shift in Israel following the victory of Likud under Menachem Begin in the 1977 Israeli legislative election. The Mahapach ended  the dominant party status of the Israeli Labor Party.

History
Begin had been a longtime rival of Labor and its leader David Ben-Gurion, the first Prime Minister of Israel (see also: Deir Yassin massacre). This has been claimed to have resulted in Israeli society becoming more religious and traditionalistic, with Haredi Judaism and Religious Zionism playing a bigger role. It also gave rise to the political mobilization of the Mizrahi Jews, who had migrated from the rest of the Middle East following Jewish exodus from Arab and Muslim countries after the 1947–1949 Palestine war which gave rise to Israeli independence.

See also
Politics in Israel

References 

Political history of Israel